Trinity Episcopal Church is a church on Edisto Island, South Carolina.

It was built in 1876 and added to the National Register of Historic Places in 1971.

References

Former Episcopal church buildings in South Carolina
Anglican Church in North America church buildings in the United States
Churches on the National Register of Historic Places in South Carolina
Churches completed in 1876
Churches in Charleston County, South Carolina
National Register of Historic Places in Charleston County, South Carolina
19th-century Episcopal church buildings
Anglican realignment congregations